Alain C. Enthoven (born September 10, 1930) is an American economist. He was a Deputy Assistant Secretary of Defense from 1961 to 1965, and from 1965 to 1969, he was the Assistant Secretary of Defense for Systems Analysis. Currently, he is Marriner S. Eccles Professor of Public and Private Management, Emeritus, at Stanford Graduate School of Business.

Enthoven received his B.A. from Stanford University in 1952, an M.Phil. from the University of Oxford in 1954, and a Ph.D. from MIT in 1956. He was a RAND Corporation economist between 1956 and 1960.

Enthoven has argued that integrated delivery systems — networks of health care organizations under a parent holding company that provide a continuum of health care services — align incentives and resources better than most healthcare delivery systems, leading to improved medical care quality while controlling costs.

He is a member of the Institute of Medicine, a fellow of the American Academy of Arts and Sciences, and is a former Rhodes scholar.

He features in the Adam Curtis documentary The Trap.

Selected publications

References

External links
 Alain C. Enthoven bio from Stanford University.
Interview about nuclear strategy for the WGBH series, War and Peace in the Nuclear Age

Living people
1930 births
Stanford University alumni
Massachusetts Institute of Technology alumni
Alumni of New College, Oxford
American Rhodes Scholars
Health economists
American economists
Kennedy administration personnel
Lyndon B. Johnson administration personnel
United States Department of Defense officials
RAND Corporation people
Stanford University Graduate School of Business faculty
Fellows of the American Academy of Arts and Sciences
Recipients of the President's Award for Distinguished Federal Civilian Service
Members of the National Academy of Medicine